ST Engineering Aerospace, formerly known as ST Aerospace, is the commercial aerospace entity of ST Engineering. Headquartered in Singapore, it has international offices and facilities located at aviation hubs in Asia-Pacific, Europe and the United States. ST Engineering's Commercial Aerospace business provides solutions for practically every stage of an aircraft life cycle, from design and engineering, original equipment manufacturing, nose-to-tail aftermarket and maintenance services as well as assets management and leasing. And also through passenger-to-freighter conversion or refurbishment, ST Engineering Aerospace gives ageing aircraft a new lease of life. 

ST Engineering Aerospace was established in 1975 to provide maintenance and support services to the Republic of Singapore Air Force (RSAF). Since then, it has diversified into various MRO capabilities for commercial and military aircraft through a number of strategic partnerships, acquisitions and investments. Major undertakings have included development of the A-4SU Super Skyhawk, a highly modified model of the Douglas A-4S Skyhawk, and the Eurocopter EC120 Colibri programme, a lightweight helicopter, in partnership with Airbus Helicopters and China National Aero-Technology Import & Export Corporation (CATIC).

In 2021, ST Engineering Aerospace reportedly employs more than 8,500 certified engineers and administrative specialists around the world and has a global customer base that includes major airlines and freight carriers. Aviation Week ranked the aerospace company as the world's largest, independent, third party airframe MRO provider with an annual capacity of more than 13 million commercial airframe man-hours in 2018.

Projects
During the 1980s, ST Engineering Aerospace commenced work on a major upgrade programme on the Douglas A-4S Skyhawk attack aircraft then in service with the Republic of Singapore Air Force (RSAF). Referred to as the A-4SU Super Skyhawk, the modification package involved replacing the original Wright J65 turbojet engine with a non-afterburning model of the newer General Electric F404-GE-100D turbofan engine, along with a complete modernisation of the avionics suite and additional equipment being installed, including a Pave Penny laser seeker, an Inertial navigation system (INS), a Tactical air navigation system (TACAN), fore & aft Radar warning receivers (RWR) and chaff/flare countermeasures) of the aircraft. In total, approximately 150 airframes (all A-4Bs and Cs) were acquired by Singapore.

Since the 1990s, ST Engineering Aerospace has been a partner involved in the Eurocopter EC120 Colibri programme. On 20 October 1992, a contract for the joint development contract of the new helicopter was signed by the three principle partners of the project, the newly-formed Eurocopter, China National Aero-Technology Import & Export Corporation (CATIC) and ST Engineering Aerospace. Under the joint development agreement, Eurocopter received a 61% controlling interest and technical leader in the programme, CATIC received a 24% work share and STAero received a 15% work share; CATIC designed and produced the cabin structure and fuel system, ST Engineering Aerospace produced the tail boom, access doors, and composite materials, while Eurocopter produced the dynamic assemblies, installed the avionics, electrical and hydraulic systems, and conducted the final assembly activity.

From the programme's onset, the EC120 had been intended to be co-produced, with partners sought in China, Singapore, and Australia. By October 1998, more than 100 orders had been received for the type, leading to the production rate being increased from four helicopters per month to six. In 2002, Eurocopter was in the process of establishing a second assembly line for the EC120 at Australian Aerospace's facility in Brisbane, Australia. On 11 June 2004, a final production agreement was signed; under the agreement, CATIA and HAIG received exclusive market rights in China, and Eurocopter agreed to stop selling French-built EC120s in mainland China. In June 2014, the People's Liberation Army of China became the launch customer for the Harbin-produced HC120, reportedly placing an order for eight of the type with options for fifty more.

Subsidiaries/Divisions
ST Engineering Aerospace Engineering Pte Ltd - provides depot level maintenance, aircraft upgrading, refurbishment, major structural repair and life extension programmes for a wide range of military and general aviation aircraft including helicopters. they also provide extensive base and line maintenance services for commercial aircraft such as the B737 and A320.
ST Engineering Aerospace Services Co Pte Ltd  - operates from Singapore's Changi and Paya Lebar airports, specialises in airframe heavy maintenance and modification for wide-body aircraft, including B747 Section 41 modification, Passenger-to-Freighter (PTF) conversion and fleet standardisation
VT Aerospace Mobile - located at the Brookley Aeroplex in Mobile, Alabama, United States, they specialise in aircraft heavy maintenance and repair of narrow-body and wide-body aircraft. They are also equipped for aircraft interior modification work, subsidiary business of VT Systems
ST Engineering Aerospace Engines Pte Ltd- provides repair and overhaul services for military and civil aero-engines and accessories.
ST Engineering Aerospace Technologies (Xiamen) Co (STATCO) - provides engine MRO services, located in Xiamen, China
ECO Services LLC -  joint investment with Pratt & Whitney, provides ECO power engine wash services, subsidiary business of VT Systems
ST Engineering Aerospace Systems - Asia Pacific's largest independent component repair and overhaul company, specializes in aircraft avionics repair and overhaul, components and systems. T .
ST Engineering Aerospace Precision Products Pte Ltd - manufactures casting and mould tooling for customers in the aerospace, oil ad gas, defense and commercial industries.
ST Engineering Aerospace Solutions - provides aircraft component repair, management and logistics services, it has facilities in various airports in Copenhagen, Denmark; Arlanda, Sweden; Gardermoen, Norway; and Stansted, United Kingdom. Originated in 2008 from the acquisition of SAS Components A/S in Copenhagen, Denmark 
Guangzhou Aerospace Technologies & Engineering (GATE) - import and export facility in China, serves as one of the ST Engineering Aerospace global distribution centres for rotables distribution.
Engineering & Development Centre (EDC) - provides avionics integration, engineering design solutions, Supplementary Type Certificates (STC), technical services 
Middle River Aerostructure Systems (MRAS) - operates in Baltimore, Maryland, US. MRAS specialises in the production of engine nacelle systems and their thrust reversers, along with complex aerostructures for applications on commercial and military aircraft.

Associated companies

Shanghai Technologies Aerospace Company (STARCO) - joint venture (49% shareholding) with China Eastern Airlines, provides aircraft MRO services, located in Shanghai, China
ST Engineering Aerospace (Guangzhou) Aviation Services Co. Ltd. (STAG) - joint venture (49% shareholding) with Guangdong Airport Management Corp, provides aircraft MRO services, located in Guangzhou, China
Turbine Overhaul Services (TOS) - joint venture (49% shareholding) with Pratt & Whitney, specialises in the repair of gas and steam-related components.
Elbe Flugzeugwerke GmbH or EADS EFW - invested equity interest (35%), capabilities include passenger-to-freighter conversions, aircraft maintenance and repair, as well as engineering services. It also manufactures and supplies composite flat sandwich panels to Airbus.
Composite Technology International (CTI) - joint venture (33.3% shareholding), provides overhaul, repair and modification services for helicopter rotor blades.

 Turbine Casting Services (TCS) - joint venture (24.5% shareholding), specialises in the repair of PW4000 turbine airfoils by using advanced coating technologies.

References

External links
Official ST Engineering Commercial Aerospace Website
ST Engineering

Aerospace companies of Singapore
Aircraft engineering companies